Alfred Wainwright (6 February 1883 – 4 June 1971) was a South African cricketer. He played in seven first-class matches for Border from 1906/07 to 1926/27.

See also
 List of Border representative cricketers

References

External links
 

1883 births
1971 deaths
South African cricketers
Border cricketers
Place of birth missing